A Bite of China: Celebrating the Chinese New Year is a 2016 Chinese documentary film directed by Chen Lei, Deng Jie, and Li Yong. It was released in China on January 7, 2016, and stars Li Lihong.

Reception
The film has grossed ¥1.36 million in China.

References

External links

2016 films
Chinese documentary films
2016 documentary films
Chinese New Year films